Qaleh-ye Seyyed (also Romanized as Qal‘eh-ye Seyyed; also known as Qal‘eh Saiyid and Seyyed) is a village in Mohr Rural District, in the Central District of Mohr County, Fars Province, Iran. At the 2006 census, its population was 27, in 6 families.

References 

Populated places in Mohr County